Ariznavarra (officially and in Basque Ariznabarra) is a neighbourhood in Vitoria-Gasteiz, Spain, in the southwest of the city.

Location 

Ariznavarra makes a triangle with the base in the train’s track, which separates it from San Martín in the North. In the South, it is bounded by the village and neighbourhood of Armentia and Mendizorroza. This last also borders it to the East. The new neighbourhood Zabalgana is in the West.

History 

Ariznavarra, as many other neighbourhoods in Vitoria, appeared in the 1960s, when hundreds of workers arrived from the rest of Spain. The city grew exponentially and new neighbourhoods, such as Zaramaga or Arana were built. These areas are very uniform and the dwellings are very similar between them.

There was a second expansion in the 80s. These buildings had more aesthetic value, are bigger and they were built in closed areas.

Nowadays Ariznavarra is a residential neighbourhood. Due to Vitoria’s expansion it is not peripheral anymore.

Streets 

Most of the streets are named after castles names which existed in Álava.

Buildings and Installations

 Civic Centre of Ariznavarra: It has one of the oldest climbing walls in Spain.
 Residence for the elderly Ariznavarra
 Football pitch, where SD Ariznavarra plays
 Ariznavarra School
 Hogar San José School
 Miguel de Cervantes School

Transport 

Bus lines 1 and 2 get close to Ariznavarra without entering it.

References 

Vitoria-Gasteiz